Igor Petrovich Zazulin (born 13 April 1974) is a Russian professional football coach and a former player.

Club career
He made his professional debut in the Soviet First League in 1991 for FC Zenit Leningrad.

Honours
 Russian Cup winner: 1999.

References

1974 births
Footballers from Saint Petersburg
Living people
Soviet footballers
Russian footballers
Russia youth international footballers
Russia under-21 international footballers
Association football midfielders
FC Zenit Saint Petersburg players
FC Fakel Voronezh players
FC Petrotrest players
Russian Premier League players
Russian football managers
FC Dynamo Saint Petersburg managers
FC Zenit-2 Saint Petersburg players